Do not let Belgrade drown (NDB) is a green political organization in Serbia.

A grassroots movement formed in 2014, aimed at criticizing and reforming the current political system through "involving citizens in the development of their environment" and transparency. The organization is made up of a group of people of different profiles, professions, and beliefs interested in urban and cultural policies, sustainable urban development, and equitable use of shared resources. In October 2022, NDB announced that it would re-organize itself as a political party.

NDB is positioned on the left-wing on the political spectrum, and has adopted left-wing populist ideas, and an anti-neoliberal, anti-nationalist, progressive, municipalist, and egalitarian ideology. It maintains socialist and social-democratic economic policies, while it is also supportive of democratic socialism, and environmentalism. NDB describes itself as a "green-left" organization, while Radomir Lazović described NDB as a "transparent, democratic, solidarity[-based], green, and leftist movement". It is a member of the Progressive International.

History

Early actions 
Citizens of Belgrade have gathered around a civic initiative "Do not let Belgrade d(r)own", whose trademark has become a big yellow duck. The initiative have organized a number of actions and protests to criticize the Belgrade waterfront urban project which, according to them, is an extremely harmful project. The public attention was drawn during the protest of 26 April and in 2015 in front of the Belgrade Cooperatives building, during the signing of the Belgrade Waterfront Contract. Then a crowd gathered with the intervention of the police enclosed by stopping two GSP trams in the middle of a roundabout in front of the Cooperative building.

The police have halted the performance of NDM BGD during the Belgrade Ship Carnival on 29 August 2015, when the duly registered vessel of the organization was excluded from the procession only because of the prominent inscription "Do not let Belgrade D(r)own".

Activities after the demolition in Savamala 
As a result of the demolition of the facilities in Hercegovacka Street, which was carried out, according to a witness, by individuals with phantom masks, at night between 24 and 25 April 2016, this citizens' movement have organized 8 massive street protests from 11 May 2016  to 15 February 2017.

Participation in elections 
During the 2017 presidential elections, the initiative has supported several candidates from opposition organizations, including Saša Janković.

This initiative participated in Belgrade assembly elections in 2018 under the list called "Initiative do not let Belgrade drown - Yellow duck - Whose city, our city - Ksenija Radovanović", introducing political platform regarding 20 agendas. The initiative's electoral efforts were supported by various local movements in municipalities across Serbia, the initiative's participation was also supported by Yanis Varoufakis with his movement DiEM25, from Barcelona's mayor Ada Colau, as well as a Croatian movement "Zagreb is OURS!".

The initiative got 3.44% of votes, which was not enough to gain threshold for entering the city's assembly (they needed 5% or higher). Best results were acquired in municipalities Stari Grad (8.06%), Vračar (7.47%) and Savski venac (6.56%).

Activities during the Coronavirus pandemic 
On 26 April 2020, the initiative have called citizens to protest against growing authoritarianism in the country by banging pots every day at 20:05. On 28 April, the initiative have suggested the authorities to take better control on the traffic during the pandemic, to protect the cyclists from inconsiderate drivers.

Activities regarding the air pollution and environment 
The initiative have taken serious stance toward the air pollution in Serbia. They have pointed out that the air quality stations are not working (not showing the current pollution). They have made protests in the Serbian capital Belgrade.

Other activities 
Since 2016, the initiative became a part of a broader coalition of similar local initiatives across Serbia, such as:

 Civic front of Serbia, nationalwide coalition
 Local front, an initiative from Kraljevo
 Association of presidents of tenant assemblies, an initiative from Niš
 Bureau of Social Research, an initiative from Belgrade
 Support RTV (Radio television of Vojvodina), an initiative from Novi Sad
 League of Romani people
 Multi-ethnic center for the region's development Danube 21, an initiative from Bor

Representatives of the initiative joined a working group to create a joint platform on fair elections and the media scene in Serbia at a meeting of the entire opposition on 12 October 2018. The movement later signed the agreement, which stemmed from these arrangements, and also took part in the One in Five Million protests.

Electoral performance

Parliamentary elections

Presidential elections

Belgrade City Assembly elections

See also 
 2021 Serbian environmental protests
 Serbian protests (2020–)
 2018–2020 Serbian protests
 2017 Serbian protests

References

2015 establishments in Serbia
Left-wing activism
Left-wing parties in Serbia
Green political parties in Serbia
Organizations based in Belgrade
Progressive International
Socialist parties in Serbia